Sir John William Lorden  was Conservative MP for St Pancras North.

He won the seat from the Liberals in 1918, held it in 1922, but lost it to Labour in 1923.

He was previously a member of the London County Council for Wandsworth, from 1910 to 1913, for the Municipal Reform Party.

Sources
Craig, FWS, ed. (1974). British Parliamentary Election Results: 1885–1918 London: Macmillan Press. p. 42. .
''Whitaker's Almanack, 1919 to 1924 editions

Conservative Party (UK) MPs for English constituencies
Members of London County Council
UK MPs 1922–1923
Knights Bachelor
English justices of the peace